Trichostema brachiatum, commonly known as fluxweed or false pennyroyal, is a plant endemic to North America.

Conservation Status
It is listed as endangered in Connecticut, Massachusetts and in New Jersey. It is listed as threatened in Michigan.

References

brachiatum
Flora of Eastern Canada
Flora of the Northeastern United States
Flora of the Southeastern United States
Flora of the North-Central United States
Flora of the South-Central United States
Flora without expected TNC conservation status